Serge Halimi (born 2 August 1955) is a French journalist working at Le Monde diplomatique since 1992.  In March 2008 he became the editorial director. He is also the author of Le Grand Bond en Arrière.

Biography
Serge Halimi was elected editorial director of Le Monde diplomatique on 17 December 2007. He assumed the position on 1 March 2008, replacing Ignacio Ramonet. Before that, he served as a journalist at the newspaper.

In 2019, citing decades of American military aventurism dragging NATO nations into wars and President Trump's erratic leadership on Syria, Halimi called for European countries to leave NATO.

Publications 
 À l'américaine, faire un président, 1986.
 Sisyphe est fatigué. Les échecs de la gauche au pouvoir, 1993.
 Les Nouveaux Chiens de garde, 1997 ; updated and enlarged in 2005.
 Quand la gauche essayait, Arléa, 2000.
 L'Opinion, ça se travaille…, Agone, 2000 ; fifth edition, with Dominique Vidal and Henri Maler, updated and enlarged in 2006, coll. « éléments ». 
 Le Grand Bond en arrière, 2004, éditions Fayard (réédité en 2006), Agone, coll. « éléments », 2012.
 Économistes à gages, 2012, Les liens qui libèrent - Le Monde diplomatique, coll. « Prendre parti ».

References

External links 
Articles by Serge Halimi in Le Monde diplomatique

1955 births
Living people
Anti-globalization activists
French male non-fiction writers
French newspaper editors
French people of Tunisian-Jewish descent
French political writers
Jewish French writers
University of California, Berkeley alumni